Steve Priolo (born January 15, 1989) is a  professional lacrosse player for the Buffalo Bandits of the National Lacrosse League. Initially drafted by the Bandits in 2009, he gained a roster spot for the 2010 NLL season. A basketball and lacrosse standout at Holy Cross Catholic Secondary School, Priolo initially played basketball at the University of Windsor before transferring to Brock University, where he played lacrosse. Outside of the NLL, Priolo has played for the St. Catharines Athletics, St. Catharines Saints, and the Brooklin Redmen. He was a finalist for the NLL's Defensive Player of the Year Award in 2013 and 2014.

References

External links
NLL stats at pointstreak.com
Brock University athletics profile

1989 births
Living people
Buffalo Bandits players
Canadian lacrosse players
Lacrosse people from Ontario
Sportspeople from St. Catharines